SciTegic was a San Diego-based software company that developed and marketed informatics software to the pharmaceutical and biotechnology industries.

History
The company was founded in February 1999 by Mathew A. Hahn and David Rogers. Mathew Hahn and David Rogers came from the bioinformatics software company Molecular Simulations.

In 2004, it became a wholly owned subsidiary of Accelrys after a 21.5 million dollar deal.

Pipeline Pilot

Pipeline pilot was designed to reduce the manual data entry and transfer steps required of computational chemists and project chemists in screening and modeling workflows. A streamlined workflow could then be used by bench scientists and reduce the need to interact with multiple software packages to one interface.

Creating Pipeline Pilot, SciTegic has pioneered a technology approach called "Data Pipelining" to flexibly process drug discovery data. This software uses a visual and dataflow programming language much like LabVIEW for piping input and output of commands together to build a pipeline to transform any number of inputs (raw data) into any number of outputs (e.g., a spreadsheet tying together the results of multiple experiments).

Mathew Hahn assumed technical leadership roles, including Chief Technology Officer, for Accelrys after the acquisition.

See also 
 Accelrys
 Kensington Discovery Edition (KDE) from Inforsense Ltd
 Taverna workbench
 TFP Lab Tech. White Carbon

References

External links
 Accelrys company website

Defunct software companies of the United States
Companies based in San Diego
Software companies of the United States
2004 mergers and acquisitions